Central Tower may refer to: 
 Central Tower (San Francisco), formerly the Call Building, in San Francisco
 Central Tower (Mongolia), a skyscraper in Ulan Bator
 Central Tower (Warsaw), a skyscraper in Warsaw, Poland, formerly known as ORCO Tower